The 2010–11 Highland Football League began on 31 July 2010 and ended on 31 May 2011. Buckie Thistle won the league for the second consecutive year. Fort William finished bottom.

Table

Results

References

Highland Football League seasons
5
Scottish